The University of Belgrade is a public university in Serbia. It is the oldest and largest modern university in Serbia. 

Founded in 1808 as the Belgrade Higher School in revolutionary Serbia, by 1838 it merged  with the Kragujevac-based departments into a single university. The university has around 97,700 enrolled students and over 4,800 academic staff members. Since its founding, the university has educated more than 378,000 bachelors, around 25,100 magisters, 29,000 specialists and 14,670 doctors. The university comprises 31 faculties, 12 research institutes, the university library, and 9 university centres. The faculties are organized into four groups: social sciences and humanities; medical sciences; natural sciences and mathematics; and technological sciences.

On Shanghai Ranking (ARWU), the University of Belgrade ranks between 401st and 500th place, according to the most recent (2018) global ranking. In 2014, it ranked 151–200, specifically in the areas of mathematics and physics.

History

19th century

The University of Belgrade was established in 1808 as the Belgrade Higher School (a Grandes écoles) by Dositej Obradović, Serbian key figure in the Age of Enlightenment. It was the highest ranking educational institution in Serbia between 1808 and 1905, as the first Higher School (1808–1813), the Belgrade Lyceum ( / Beogradski Licej; 1838–1863), and the second Higher School (1863–1905). It was initially located at the Princess Ljubica's Residence building and then moved to another significant site in Belgrade, the Captain Miša’s Mansion, today's seat of the university.

The second Higher School (also known as the Great School or Great Academy of Belgrade) was established as the successor of the Lyceum and was a combination of a classical gymnasium and a college, and as such developed into the University of Belgrade. Under the law, it was defined as a "scientific institute for higher and professional education". The minister of education had control over this institution and it was managed by the rector (elected by the monarch) and Academic Council.

During its early history it had three departments: Philosophy, Engineering and Law. The Higher School formally became the University of Belgrade through the Law on the University from February 27, 1905. In addition to the Philosophy, Law and Electrical Engineering departments, this law introduced the Orthodox Theology and Medical schools.

In the early 19th century, the studies of law lasted three years and the curriculum included comparative and state (constitutional) law, international law, criminal law and judicial procedure, as well as general subjects. This is how the modern legal education in Serbia emerged in the year 1808. Before enrolling the legal department, it was compulsory to graduate at the philosophy department where the studies lasted two years, so the legal studies lasted a total of five years. Since 1853, the legal education became independent from the studies of philosophy and from 1863 the legal education in Serbia lasted four years.

The lectures were held by professors who had earned their diplomas in Austria, Germany and France (Jovan Sterija Popović, Josif Pančić, Đura Daničić, and others).

During the 1850s, the Philosophy (General) Department developed into a particular college. The University of Belgrade's Faculty of Philosophy is today's continuation of this department.

The first academic lecture on electrical engineering in Serbia was held in 1894. Professor Stevan Marković was the first lecturer and founder of the Engineering Department at the Higher School. Only four years later, Professor Marković also established the first Serbian electrical engineering laboratory. Since then, this academic discipline has been studied at the Higher School and the University of Belgrade. The first diplomas in this field were given in 1922.

20th century
 
The University of Belgrade witnessed a massive growth and expansion in the years before the Second World War and especially after the founding of the second Yugoslavia. The first woman graduated from the University of Belgrade's Law School in 1914.

In the 1960s and 70s, the university developed into a remarkable regional and international educational institution. Many students from other countries were trained there. Up to 40,000 students from Africa alone studied at the University of Belgrade during the existence of the SFR Yugoslavia. In the socialist Yugoslavia, the university was expanded, but it was also exposed to state and ideological influence. It has also been the driving force for the establishment of almost all other universities in today's Serbia, Montenegro, North Macedonia and several universities in Bosnia and Herzegovina.

In 1968, its students organized the first mass protest in post-World War II Yugoslavia.

In the early 1990s the quality of university programs deteriorated as a consequence of the political instability in the country and the subsequent wars of Yugoslavia. There was a lack of financial resources and the quality dropped significantly. During the Milošević government in Serbia, the university had to face external political pressure and the lack of academic and administrative autonomy.

In the mid-1990s, the University of Belgrade became an internationally recognized center of the political opposition in Serbia. Massive anti-government protests were staged by the Belgrade students and professors. The university's student organizations (especially "Otpor!") significantly contributed to overthrowing the government.

21st century
The university has become a signatory of the Bologna declaration. Being one of Europe's largest universities with an enrollment of nearly 90,000 students, the university broadly cooperates with international academic institutions and is involved in countless bilateral and multilateral academic projects.

Ranking

The University of Belgrade has found its place amongst the top 300 universities in the world, according to the most recent (2017) ranking carried out by the Shanghai Jiao Tong University, better known as the Shanghai List. In the area of mathematics, it is ranked among the top 150 universities in the world.

Campus

Having developed with the city in the 19th century, a number of the university buildings are an important part of Belgrade’s architecture and cultural heritage. Former sites include today's Museum of Vuk and Dositej and Princess Ljubica's Residence buildings, both of them being recognized as Belgrade's topmost historic buildings. The historical Subotica Law School (1920-1941) was also a part of the University of Belgrade. Some of the post-World War II facilities were built in the brutalist style. The university has sites throughout the city, with the two major campuses, one next to the Prince Michael Street at Studentski Trg and the other on King Alexandar Boulevard. It has eleven dormitories scattered throughout the city's urban neighborhoods for 11,340 students, including one dormitory complex in New Belgrade. Many of the schools have separate buildings at various locations in Belgrade. The university also owns several endowment buildings in the downtown district, most of them being built in the 19th and early 20th century.

The central administrative building, Faculty of Philology and Faculty of Philosophy are located at Studentski Trg. The Faculty of Biology, Faculty of Geography, Faculty of Mathematics, Faculty for Physical Chemistry, Faculty of Physics and Faculty of Chemistry are situated in one building at Studentski Trg as well. The University Library, Law School, Faculty of Architecture, Faculty of Civil Engineering, Faculty of Electrical Engineering, Faculty of Mechanical Engineering are situated at the King Alexandar Boulevard campus.

Other major academic sites include the School of Economics building near the downtown district, the Faculty of Orthodox Theology building at Bogoslovija (Palilula neighborhood), the Teachers’ Training Faculty building in the Savski Venac municipality, the Faculty of Security Studies building in the Vračar neighborhood, and the Faculty for Special Education and Rehabilitation building in the Dorćol neighborhood. The School of Medicine and School of Dental Medicine share a building near the Karađorđev Park, next to several hospitals. Medical teaching facilities, such as the University Hospital Center or Institute of Mental Health are on other locations within the city. The Faculty of Agriculture is situated alongside the Zemun City Park and it operates the Radmilovac experimental farm in Grocka. The Faculty of Political Sciences and Faculty of Organizational Sciences are situated close to each other in the same street of the Voždovac neighborhood.

Organization and administration
The University of Belgrade is governed by the 44-member University Senate elected for a three-year term. The senate is composed of the rector, 4 vice-rectors, 31 deans, 4 presidents of the faculty Group Councils and 4 directors of scientific institutes. 8 student-representatives with a one-year term elected by the university's Student Parliament participate in the work of the Senate. The rector provides governance and represents the university externally.

The University Council is a 31-member managing body. The university entrusts 21 members, 5 are appointed by the Serbian government and 5 elected by the university's Student Parliament. The University Council has its president (chairperson) and vice president. In addition to these bodies, the university has advisory academic councils and professional boards, appointed to adopt decisions and state their opinion on the election of teaching staff.

Faculties
The university is divided into 31 faculties, including (with data about academic staff and number of students as of 2018–19 school year):

Research institutes
 Institute for Applied Nuclear Energy
 Institute for Chemistry, Technology and Metallurgy
 Institute of History
 Institute for Medical Research
 Institute for Molecular Genetics and Genetic Engineering
 Institute for Multidisciplinary Research
 Institute for Philosophy and Social Theory
 Institute of Physics
 Mihajlo Pupin Institute
 Nikola Tesla Institute of Electrical Engineering
 Siniša Stanković Institute for Biological Research
 Vinča Nuclear Institute

Centers
 Information Center
 Computer Center
 Serbian-Japanese Center for Scientific Simulations
 Center for Career Development
 Center for Strategic Management
 Center for Technology Transfer
 Center for Students with Disabilities
 Center for Quality Assurance
 Center for Lifelong Learning

Academics

The Belgrade Law School, established in 1808, is a regional leader in legal education and one of the largest law schools in the Balkans. Its law education prepares students for working in law practice, business, public service and teaching. The Residence of Countess Ljubica as well as Captain Miša's Mansion once used to be home to this educational institution when it was within the Belgrade Higher School. Since its founding, it has educated almost 50,000 law graduates, around 1,200 magistri iuris and 830 doctores iuris, as well as hundreds of specialists in various areas. Many Faculty of Law alumni have become recognized experts and scholars in all branches of law, law professors and high ranking government officials.

All the law schools established subsequently in Serbia (Subotica, Novi Sad, Pristina, Niš, Kragujevac), Montenegro (Podgorica), and in other parts of the former Yugoslavia (Sarajevo, Skopje) were formed from the University of Belgrade Faculty of Law as a core.

Initially established in 1937, the Faculty of Economics was the first centre of higher education dedicated to the study of economics in the Kingdom of Yugoslavia. Its curriculum includes courses in economic analysis and policy; marketing; accounting, auditing and financial management; trade and commerce; finance, banking and insurance; tourism and hotel industry; statistics and informatics; management and international economics and foreign trade.

The Faculty of Philosophy is one of the oldest institutions of higher education in Serbia, founded in the early 19th century. It employs a staff of 255 teachers and has approximately 6,000 undergraduate and graduate students within nine departments.

The Faculty of Philology trains and educates its students in the academic study or practice in linguistics and philology. The study of philology was established in Belgrade within the Belgrade Higher School's Department of Philosophy in 1808. Today, the school offers courses in philology, linguistics and literature in dozens of languages. The school is divided into departments, which possess their own libraries, it operates several research centers and publishes a number of periodical publications.

The Faculty of Electrical Engineering is also an important part of the university. The first lecture on electrical engineering was held in 1894. Professor Stevan Marković was the first lecturer and founder of the Engineering Department within the Belgrade Higher School. Marković also established the first Serbian electrical engineering laboratory in 1898. Today, the school is divided into a number of departments, offering a wide range of electrical engineering programs.

The Belgrade Medical School was established in 1920 and more than 30,000 students graduated from this institution, including circa 850 international students. The School of Medicine is composed of 40 departments with over 200 professorships. The school offers an extensive number of academic courses, including specialization practice within a network of hospitals, institutes and medical clinics.

The Faculty of Stomatology (Belgrade Dental School) was established in 1948. The first head of the newly founded faculty was Dr. Aleksandar Djordjevic, Professor of the Faculty of Medicine at that time. In organizing and teaching the students of dentistry after its establishment, and long after, many teachers of the Faculty of Medicine and Veterinary Medicine and Faculty of Pharmacy have contributed a lot. The Faculty of Stomatology is composed of 8 teaching and scientific and healthcare organizational units.

Under the umbrella of the humanities faculty, the Faculty of Security Studies has its roots in the Institute for National Defense of the Natural Sciences and Mathematics Faculty, University of Belgrade. In 1978, this institute evolved into the free-standing Faculty of People's Defense, which was renamed several times before becoming the Faculty of Security Studies in May 2006. The Faculty of Security Studies focuses on all aspects of security studies, human and social resources, defense, civil defense and environmental protection, offering professional training, undergraduate and postgraduate degrees.

Student life

Residential life
The University of Belgrade offers housing options within 11 student dormitories and it has the largest student housing system in Serbia, accommodating up to 10,154 students at various locations throughout the city.

Dormitories 
 ''Studentski grad'' (4,406)
 ''Karaburma'' (1,170)
 ''Patris Lumumba'' (1,021)
 ''4. April'' (863)
 ''Slobodan Penezić'' (756)
 ''Kralj Aleksandar I'' (525)
 ''Košutnjak'' (413)
 ''Rifat Burdžević'' (367)
 ''Vera Blagojević I'' and ''Vera Blagojević II'' (313)
 ''Žarko Marinović'' (188)
 ''Mika Mitrović'' (162)
The university's "Studentski grad" in New Belgrade is a dormitory complex organized into 4 blocks. It has a theater building, movie theater, facilities for athletics, two libraries, reading rooms and open stage for summer concerts.

The other dormitories are smaller by capacity and scattered throughout the city's urban neighbourhoods. ''Kralj Aleksandar I'' Dormitory (also known as "Lola") at the King Alexandar Boulevard campus is the oldest dormitory in the Balkans, founded in 1927 by King Alexander I of Yugoslavia. It has 190 rooms and provides accommodation for the university's successful students, based on their grade point average. Some of the dormitories got their names after political leaders. As an example, the Patrice Lumumba Hall of Residence at Belgrade University built in 1961 today continues to carry the name of Lumumba, the first legally elected Prime Minister of the Republic of the Congo after he helped win its independence from Belgium.

Notable alumni

 David Albahari
 Athanasios Angelopoulos
 Branka Arsić
 Larisa Blazic (video installation artist) 
 Martin Camaj
 Branko Ćopić
 Araldo Cossutta
 Miloš Crnjanski
 Mirko Cvetković 
 Jovan Cvijić
 Zoran Đinđić
 Milorad Dodik
 Vuk Drašković 
 Mitja Gaspari 
 Kiro Gligorov 
 Ilijas Farah
 Serbian Patriarch Irinej
 John of Shanghai and San Francisco
 Srgjan Kerim  
 Danilo Kiš
 Vojislav Koštunica  
 Vuk Kulenovic
 Milan Kurepa
 Paulina Lebl-Albala
 Sima Lozanić
 Bogdan Maglich
 Sehadete Mekuli
 Desanka Maksimović
 Branko Milanović
 Miroslav Marcovich
 Radenka Maric
 Mihailo Marković
 Vladimir Markovic
 Miloš Milojević
 Miloš N. Đurić
 Nikola Milošević
 Jelena Mišić
 Dragoslav Mitrinović
 Lazar Mojsov
 Abdul Rahman Munif
 Branislav Nušić
 Okwesilieze Nwodo
 Žarana Papić
 Fredy Perlman
 Mihailo Petrović
 Vaso Radić
 Branka Raunig
 Dania Ben Sassi
 Pavle Savić
 Meša Selimović
 Ivan Stambolić  
 Limon Staneci
 Vojislav Stanimirović
 Borisav Stanković
 Boris Tadić 
 Ljubomir Tadić
 Stevo Todorčević
 Zaim Topčić
 Dimitrije Tucović
 Danilo Türk
Aleksandar Vučić
 Filip Vujanović 
 Svetozar Vukmanović-Tempo
 Miomir Vukobratović
 Ashagre Yigletu 
 Philip Zepter
 Tamara Rastovac

See also 

 Education in Serbia
 List of universities in Serbia
 List of modern universities in Europe (1801–1945)

References

Further reading
University of Belgrade: A Centennial of the First Serbian University Law, 2005, 
The Benefactors of Belgrade University: Gallery of SASA, October - November 2005: [exhibition], 2005,

External links

 University of Belgrade official website 

 
Educational institutions established in 1808
University
18th-century establishments in Serbia
Universities and colleges in Serbia